An R Coronae Borealis variable (abbreviated RCB, R CrB) is an eruptive variable star that varies in luminosity in two modes, one low amplitude pulsation (a few tenths of a magnitude), and one irregular, unpredictably-sudden fading by 1 to 9 magnitudes. The prototype star R Coronae Borealis was discovered by the English amateur astronomer Edward Pigott in 1795, who first observed the enigmatic fadings of the star. Only about 150 RCB stars are currently known in our Galaxy while up to 1000 were expected, making this class a very rare kind of star.

It is increasingly suspected that R Coronae Borealis (RCB) stars – rare hydrogen-deficient and carbon-rich supergiant stars – are the product of mergers of white-dwarfs in the intermediary mass regime (total mass between 0.6 and 1.2 ). The fading is caused by condensation of carbon to soot, making the star fade in visible light while measurements in infrared light exhibit no real luminosity decrease. R Coronae Borealis variables are typically supergiant stars in the spectral classes F and G (by convention called "yellow"), with typical C2 and CN molecular bands, characteristic of yellow supergiants. RCB star atmospheres do however lack hydrogen by an abundance of 1 part per 1,000 down to 1 part per 1,000,000 relative to helium and other chemical elements, while the universal abundance of hydrogen is about 3 to 1 relative to helium.

Diversity

There is a considerable variation in spectrum between various RCB specimens. Most of the stars with known spectrum are either F to G class ("yellow") supergiants, or a comparatively cooler C-R type carbon star supergiant. Three of the stars are however of the "blue" B type, for example VZ Sagittarii. Four stars are unusually and inexplicably poor in iron absorption lines in the spectrum. The constant features are prominent carbon lines, strong atmospheric hydrogen deficiencies, and obviously the intermittent fadings.

The DY Persei variables have been considered a sub-class of R CrB variable, although they are less luminous carbon-rich AGB stars and may be unrelated.

Physics

Two main models for carbon dust formation near the R Coronae Borealis stars have been proposed, one model that presumes the dust forms at a distance of 20 star radii from the center of the star, and one model that presumes that the dust forms in the photosphere of the star. The rationale for the 20 radii formation is that the carbon condensation temperature is 1,500 K, while the photospheric dust model was formulated by the 20 radii model's failure to explain the fast decline of the RCBs' light curves just before reaching minimum. The 20 radii model requires a large and thereby long-time buildup of the obstructing dust cloud, making the fast light decline hard to comprehend.

The alternate theory of photospheric buildup of carbon dust in a 4,500–6,500 K temperature environment could be explained by condensations in the low pressure parts of shock fronts – being detected in the atmosphere of RY Sagittarii – a condensation that causes local runaway cooling, allowing carbon dust to form.

The formation of the stars themselves is also unclear.  Standard stellar evolution models do not produce large luminous stars with essentially zero hydrogen.  The two main theories to explain these stars are both somewhat exotic, perhaps befitting such rare stars.  In one, a merger occurs between two white dwarf stars, one a Helium white dwarf and the other a carbon-oxygen white dwarf.  White dwarfs are naturally lacking in hydrogen and the resultant star would also lack that element.  The second model postulates a massive convective event at the onset of burning of an outer helium shell, causing the little remaining atmospheric Hydrogen to be turned over into the interior of the star. It is possible that the diversity of R CrB stars is caused by a diversity of formation mechanisms, relating them to extreme helium stars and hydrogen-deficient carbon stars.

List of stars
This list contains all the R CrB stars listed in the GCVS, as well as other notable examples.

See also
 Thorne–Żytkow object

References

External links
 R Coronae Borealis stars, by C. Simon Jeffrey, Armagh Observatory Northern Ireland
 Entry in the Encyclopedia of Astrobiology, Astronomy, and Spaceflight
 The R Coronae Borealis Stars, by Geoffrey C. Clayton, from SAO/NASA Astrophysics Data System (ADS)
 Variable Star of the Month, January, 2000: R Coronae Borealis, at the AAVSO website